Alastair William Gillespie,  (May 1, 1922 – August 19, 2018) was a Canadian politician and businessman.

Gillespie was born in Victoria, British Columbia, the son of Errol Pilkington Gillespie and Catherine Beatrice (Oliver) Gillespie.

He attended Brentwood College School where he was an avid rugby player. He received a Bachelor of Commerce degree from McGill University in 1947 and a Masters of Arts from Oxford University as a Rhodes Scholar in 1949. He later received a Master of Commerce from the University of Toronto in 1958.

Gillespie worked at educational publisher W.J. Gage & Co from 1949 to 1970, beginning in warehouse operations and finishing as director and vice president.

During World War II, Gillespie served in Europe as a pilot in the Canadian Fleet Air Arm and was a Lieutenant in the Royal Canadian Navy from 1941 to 1945.

He was elected to the House of Commons of Canada as a Liberal Member of Parliament (MP) for the Toronto area riding of Etobicoke in the 1968 election. He was re-elected in the 1972 and 1974 elections. His district was divided by electoral redistribution in 1976, which took effect at the election of 1979. He ran in 1979, losing to Progressive Conservative candidate Michael Wilson in Etobicoke Centre.

Gillespie held various ministerial positions in Prime Minister Pierre Elliot Trudeau's government, including: Minister of Industry, Trade and Commerce; Minister of Energy, Mines and Resources; Minister of State for Science and Technology; and Parliamentary Secretary to the President of the Treasury Board. He is one of the longest-serving Privy Counsellors of the Queen's Privy Council for Canada, having been nominated to that body in 1971 by Prime Minister Trudeau.

In 1998, he was made an Officer of the Order of Canada.

Gillespie was director and chairman of Creemore Springs Brewery from 1996 to 2005.  He was director of the Canadian Opera Company from 1981 to 1993 and president from 1986 to 1988. A member of the Campaign for Scottish Studies at the University of Guelph, he was named 2003 Scot of the Year by the Scottish Studies Society. In 2010, he was awarded the office of Honorary President of the Champlain Society for his support of the advancement of knowledge of Canadian history through the publication and study of primary records.

Alastair Gillespie was married to Diana Christie Gillespie (Clark, d. 2010) and has two children, Ian Gillespie and Cynthia Webb. He is the grandfather of former Canadian professional tennis player, Olympian, NCAA Division I women's tennis champion and Duke University Athletics Hall of Fame member Vanessa Webb. He died in August 2018 at the age of 96.

Bibliography
 Gillespie, Alastair W. and Irene Sage, Made in Canada: A Businessman's Adventures in Politics, Robin Brass Studio, 2010.

Archives
There is an Alastair Gillespie fonds at Library and Archives Canada.

Electoral record

References

1922 births
2018 deaths
Canadian Anglicans
Canadian Rhodes Scholars
Liberal Party of Canada MPs
McGill University Faculty of Management alumni
Members of the House of Commons of Canada from Ontario
Members of the King's Privy Council for Canada
Officers of the Order of Canada
Politicians from Toronto
Politicians from Victoria, British Columbia
University of Toronto alumni